"Out Of My Mind" is the 28th single by English new wave band Duran Duran. The song is part of their ninth album, Medazzaland (1997), but was released as a single from the soundtrack to the 1997 Val Kilmer film The Saint.

Background and release
During the development of Medazzaland, "Out Of My Mind" was written by Simon Le Bon as the last of a trilogy of songs for his late friend David Miles (the others being "Do You Believe in Shame?" and "Ordinary World"). After the album was complete, Capitol Records shopped around certain tracks to Hollywood movie studios, hoping to get a Duran Duran song attached to one of the year's summer blockbusters. In January, Paramount Pictures showed interest in including "Out Of My Mind" on the soundtrack album for The Saint.

In March 1997, the soundtrack and single for "Out Of My Mind" were released internationally on Virgin Records, marking the first time a Duran Duran release (single or album) had been released on an imprint other than EMI/Parlophone (or Capitol/EMI for North America). Virgin was also a division of EMI at the time. The single peaked at #21 on UK Singles Chart in May, and at #14 in Italy.

Music video
The accompanying music video for "Out of My Mind" was filmed by director Dean Karr in February, at the historic Krumlov Castle in the city of Český Krumlov, in the Czech Republic.  It featured many special effects, including the use of sophisticated prosthetic makeup to age singer Simon Le Bon over the course of the video.

B-sides, bonus tracks and remixes

"Out Of My Mind" featured the two b-sides "Sinner or Saint" (written specifically for the movie) and "Silva Halo", an album track from Medazzaland.

There were a multitude of remixes done for the track, mostly by the Perfecto crew (Paul Oakenfold and Steve Osborne). In 1997-2001 live performances, the band chose to perform the darker and more rock-oriented Perfecto version rather than the album version.

Formats and track listing

 7": Virgin. / VSLH 1639 (Promo) United Kingdom
 "Out Of My Mind" (Single Edit) - 3:47
 "Out Of My Mind" (Single Edit) - 3:46

 12": Virgin. / VST 1639 United Kingdom
 "Out Of My Mind" (Perfecto Mix) - 5:51
 "Out Of My Mind" (Perfecto Instrumental) - 5:47
 "Out Of My Mind" (Perfecto Dub 1) - 6:41
 "Out Of My Mind" (Perfecto Dub 2) - 6:25

 12": Virgin. / VSTDJ 1639 (Promo) United Kingdom
 "Out Of My Mind" (Perfecto Mix) - 5:45
 "Out Of My Mind" (Perfecto Instrumental) - 5:45
 "Out Of My Mind" (Perfecto Dub) - 6:44
 "Out Of My Mind" (Perfecto Dub 2) - 6:28
Note: The Paul Oakenfold Mixes.

 CD: Virgin. / VSCDT 1639 United Kingdom
 "Out Of My Mind" (Album Version) - 4:15
 "Silva Halo" - 2:24
 "Sinner or Saint" - 4:06
 "Out Of My Mind" (Electric Remix) - 4:25

 CD: Virgin. / VSCDX 1639 United Kingdom
 "Out Of My Mind" (Perfecto Radio Edit) - 3:46
 "Out Of My Mind" (Perfecto Mix) - 5:51
 "Out Of My Mind" (Perfecto Instrumental) - 5:47
 "Out Of My Mind" (Perfecto Dub 1) - 6:41
Note: Also known under catalogue number: Duran 1.

 CD: Virgin. / DPRO-12236 (Promo) United Kingdom
 "Out Of My Mind" (Single Edit) - 3:47
 "Out Of My Mind" (Album Version) - 4:15
 "Out Of My Mind" (Saber Radio Remix) - 4:03
 "Out Of My Mind" (Metropolis Remix) - 4:25
 "Out Of My Mind" (Call Out Research Hook) - 0:10

 CD: Virgin. / V25D-38586 United States
 "Out of My Mind" (Metropolis Remix) - 4:28
 "Sinner or Saint" - 4:07

 CD: Virgin. / DPRO-12236 (Promo) United States
 "Out Of My Mind" (Single Edit) - 3:47
 "Out Of My Mind" (Album Version) - 4:15
 "Out Of My Mind" (Saber Radio Remix) - 4:03
 "Out Of My Mind" (Metropolis Remix) - 4:25
 "Out Of My Mind" (Call Out Research Hook) - 0:10

Charts

Other appearances
Aside from the single, "Out Of My Mind" has also appeared on:

Albums:
 Medazzaland
 The Saint: Music From the Motion Picture Soundtrack

Singles:
 "Electric Barbarella" (US)

Personnel 
Duran Duran are:
 Nick Rhodes - keyboards
 Simon Le Bon - vocals
 Warren Cuccurullo - guitar, bass

Other credits 
 Dave DiCenso - live drums
 Talvin Singh - tabla and santoor

References

Duran Duran songs
1997 singles
Songs written by Warren Cuccurullo
Songs written by Nick Rhodes
Songs written by Simon Le Bon
1996 songs
Virgin Records singles